The following lists events that happened during 2011 in Yemen.

Incumbents
President: Ali Abdullah Saleh

Events

January
 January 3 - Two boats capsize off the southern coast of Yemen with a total of 80 people missing. Only three have been found alive.
 January 14 - At least 10 people arrested in clashes between police and protesters.
 January 24 - Yemen frees a female activist accused of inciting disorder after protests demanding her release.
 January 27 - Tens of thousands of people protest in Sana'a calling for an end to the government of President Ali Abdullah Saleh.
 January 29 - Clashes take place outside the Egyptian embassy between supporters of President Ali Abdullah Saleh's government and opposition supporters expressing sympathy with the situation in Egypt.

February

 February 2 - President Ali Abdullah Saleh backtracks on his plan to rule Yemen for life and to then allow his son to inherit his rule during an emergency session of parliament ahead of tomorrow's "day of rage" against his three-decade rule.

References

 
Years of the 21st century in Yemen
Yemen
Yemen
2010s in Yemen